The name Otis has been used for four tropical cyclones in the Eastern Pacific Ocean.

 Hurricane Otis (1981)
 Hurricane Otis (1987)
 Hurricane Otis (2005) – Threatened the Baja California Peninsula, but turned away.
 Hurricane Otis (2017) – No threat to land. 

Pacific hurricane set index articles